Saturday Night Live has featured many recurring characters that appear in sketches with a musical theme.  In addition there are characters listed here who predominantly featured music, but may not have exclusively featured it.

 Nick The Lounge Singer (Bill Murray) – April 16, 1977
 The Blues Brothers (Dan Aykroyd, John Belushi) – April 22, 1978
 Candy Slice (Gilda Radner) – December 9, 1978
 Buckwheat (Eddie Murphy) – October 10, 1981
 Pudge & Solomon (Joe Piscopo, Eddie Murphy) – January 30, 1982
 The Sweeney Sisters (Jan Hooks, Nora Dunn, Marc Shaiman) – October 18, 1986
 Tonto, Tarzan & Frankenstein's Monster (Jon Lovitz, Kevin Nealon, Phil Hartman) – December 19, 1987
 I'm Chillin' (Chris Rock, Chris Farley) – January 12, 1991
 Opera Man (Adam Sandler) – April 18, 1992
 Mighty Mack Blues (John Goodman) – March 25, 1995
 G-Dog (Tim Meadows) – December 2, 1995
 The Roxbury Guys (Chris Kattan, Will Ferrell) – March 23, 1996
 The Culps (Ana Gasteyer, Will Ferrell) – November 2, 1996
 Janet Reno's Dance Party (Will Ferrell) – January 11, 1997
 The DeMarco Brothers (Chris Parnell, Chris Kattan) – March 15, 1997
 Gunner Olsen (Jim Breuer) – March 7, 1998
 7 Degrees Celsius (Will Ferrell, Chris Kattan, Chris Parnell, Jimmy Fallon, Horatio Sanz) – January 16, 1999
 Gemini's Twin (Maya Rudolph, Ana Gasteyer) – November 4, 2000
 Rap Street (Jerry Minor, Horatio Sanz) – November 18, 2000
 Season's Greetings From Saturday Night Live (Christmas is Number One) (Horatio Sanz, Jimmy Fallon, Chris Kattan, Tracy Morgan) – December 16, 2000
 The Kelly Brothers (Fred Armisen, Will Forte) – February 8, 2003
 Mascots (Justin Timberlake) – October 11, 2003
 The Prince Show (Fred Armisen, Maya Rudolph) – February 14, 2004
 The Lundford Twins Feel Good Variety Hour (Fred Armisen, Amy Poehler) – January 22, 2005
 Deep House Dish (Kenan Thompson, Rachel Dratch, Andy Samberg) – November 19, 2005
 The Lawrence Welk Show (Fred Armisen, Kristen Wiig) – October 4, 2008
 Les Jeunes de Paris (Taran Killam) - October 23, 2010

See also
 Recurring Saturday Night Live characters and sketches
 Recurring Saturday Night Live characters and sketches (listed chronologically)
 Saturday Night Live TV show sketches
 Saturday Night Live commercials
 Saturday Night Live characters appearing on Weekend Update

Lists of recurring Saturday Night Live characters and sketches